Kikumaro is a Japanese name.  It may refer to:

 Tsukimaro, an early-19th-century Japanese artist who also worked under the name Kikumaro
 Prince Yamashina Kikumaro (1873–1908), a prince of the Japanese imperial family